COBUILD, an acronym for Collins Birmingham University International Language Database, is a British research facility set up at the University of Birmingham in 1980 and funded by Collins publishers.

The facility was initially led by Professor John Sinclair. The most important achievements of the COBUILD project have been the creation and analysis of an electronic corpus of contemporary text, the Collins Corpus, later leading to the development of the Bank of English, and the production of the monolingual learner's dictionary Collins COBUILD English Language Dictionary, again based on the study of the COBUILD corpus and first published in 1987.

A number of other dictionaries and grammars have also been published, all based exclusively on evidence from the Bank of English.

References

Further reading

External links
COBUILD Reference

1980 establishments in the United Kingdom
Organizations established in 1980
University of Birmingham
Online English dictionaries
Linguistic research institutes
Applied linguistics